The Tobacco MSA with New York is the particular version of the Tobacco MSA that was signed in New York City, was enabled by means of legislation in New York State, and has been interpreted since then in New York State courts.

Master settlement agreement
In 1997, the State, City, and the counties of New York filed suit against the country's major cigarette manufacturers. The action sought to recover damages related to the costs borne by these various political units of treating smoking-related illnesses and to impose restrictions on the cigarette manufacturers' sales, marketing, advertising, and disclosure practices. Similar actions were brought by 45 other states. These lawsuits were settled by execution of the MSA in November 1998. The settlement of the New York lawsuit was approved by the Supreme Court of New York in a consent decree signed on December 23, 1998.

The MSA was initially executed by the four dominant (alleged to account for 98% of cigarette sales at the time) cigarette manufacturers, Philip Morris, Lorillard Tobacco, Brown & Williamson, and R.J. Reynolds (the "Original Participating Manufacturers, or "OPMs"), and by forty-six states (including New York), the District of Columbia, Puerto Rico, American Samoa, Guam, the Northern Mariana Islands, and the U.S. Virgin Islands (the "Settling States"). Thirty-three additional, and smaller, tobacco companies (the "Subsequent Participating Manufacturers" ("SPMs"), or, together with the OPMs, the "Participating Manufacturers ("PMs")) became parties to the MSA.

In general, the MSA imposes numerous restrictions and requirements in connection with the PMs' sales, marketing, advertising, lobbying, research, education, and disclosure practices. It also requires annual payments by the OPMs to the Settling States, and releases the PMs from future claims by the Settling States. Any non-participating cigarette manufacturer ("Non-Participating Manufacturer," or "NPM") may become a SPM by signing the MSA and making the payments that would have been due had it been a signatory as of the MSA execution date.

The OPMs' overall annual payment obligation is specified in the MSA: The nationwide base payments begin at $4.5 billion for the year 2000 and gradually increase to $9 billion in the year 2018 and each year thereafter. This obligation is allocated among the OPMs in accordance with their relative market shares. Annual payments to the Settling States are to be adjusted according to changes in the overall volume of cigarette sales. A significant reduction in sales will therefore lead to a reduction in payments and state revenue.

Market share loss provisions

By OPMs to other PMs

In addition to the link between overall cigarette sales and payments to the Settling States noted above, there are provisions for changes in the payments required of particular companies due to changes in their market share. One such provision applies to market share losses by any OPM to other PMs. In general, an OPM losing market share pays less to the states; an OPM gaining market share pays more. Future payment obligations of SPMs—those arising after the initial payment made upon joining the MSA—occur only if a particular manufacturer's market share rises above the greater of (i) 100% of its 1998 market share, or (ii) 125% of its 1997 market share. Any future payments owed by SPMs are at a rate approximately equal to that paid by the OPMs.

By OPMs to NPMs

Another provision governs the reduction of payments where market share is lost by an OPM to NPMs. This decrease is styled by the MSA as the "Non-Participating Manufacturer Adjustment" (the "NPM Adjustment") and reduces required payments if there are any losses of market share experienced by the OPMs as a result of "disadvantages" arising out of the MSA. One of the contemplated "disadvantages" is price competition from NPMs. Because the NPM Adjustment trebles the decrease in payment obligations when an OPM loses more than 2% due to a "disadvantage," the loss of revenue to the Settling States from an NPM Adjustment is potentially substantial. If the OPM's market share loss exceeds 16⅔%, the decrease in payment obligations is somewhat less than the treble reduction for losses between 2% and 16⅔%.

New York Escrow Statute
Under the MSA, the Settling States do not have to sit idly by while their MSA tobacco revenue is reduced over time by competition from NPMs. A Settling State can immunize itself from downward NPM Adjustments by enacting and "diligently enforcing" a form "Escrow Statute" requiring any NPM either:
(i) to join the MSA (becoming a SPM and making future settlement payments accordingly with respect to any increased market share), or
(ii) on a regular basis to place into a 25-year rolling escrow account funds alleged to be greater than the amount such manufacturer would pay were it a SPM under the MSA.
All of the Settling States have enacted Escrow Statutes.

New York enacted its Escrow Statute on November 27, 1999. The Statute provides that any tobacco product manufacturer selling cigarettes directly or indirectly to consumers within New York shall either become a PM under the MSA, or make escrow payments. Specifically, the statute requires that NPMs who sell cigarettes through a distributor, retailer, or similar intermediary place a per-pack fee into an escrow account that may be recovered by the NPM after twenty years if no obligation to the states has been incurred. The statute thus imposes a per-pack fee on NPM-manufactured cigarettes that adds to the resale price of the product. Although this fee does not expressly require the product to be sold at a particular price, the cost to NPMs of complying with the Escrow Statute is alleged to be higher than the cost to PMs of complying with the MSA.

New York's Contraband Statutes

Effective December 28, 2001, New York passed the Contraband Statutes. In Governor Pataki's words, this legislation was needed to "bolster the State's ability to diligently enforce" the Escrow Statute, and thus to "help protect the State from further [NPM] adjustments." To be sold lawfully in New York, cigarette packages need to bear a tax stamp affixed by a New York State cigarette tax stamp agent. The Contraband Statutes add the requirements of the Escrow Statute to the "gatekeeper" functions already played by tax stamp agents. The Statutes label as contraband any cigarettes made by manufacturers that do not comply with the Escrow Statute. The effect alleged is to impose something analogous to an in rem liability on the cigarettes themselves, rendering them subject to seizure and forfeiture, in contrast to the in personam liability imposed on NPMs by the Escrow Statutes. Twenty-four of the Settling States have passed Contraband Statutes.

The particulars of the Statutes are as follows. Section 480-b requires cigarette manufacturers to certify annually, to the New York State Commissioner of Taxation and Finance, the Attorney General of the State of New York, and the cigarette tax stamp agents (according to appellants, usually wholesalers 6 responsible for affixing New York State cigarette tax stamps on such manufacturer's cigarettes), that such manufacturer is either: (a) a PM making payments under the MSA (i.e. satisfying Section 1399-pp(1) of the Escrow Statute) or (b) in compliance with the escrow requirements of Section 1399-pp(2) of the Escrow Statute. Section 480-b also prohibits New York State cigarette tax stamp agents from affixing tax stamps to cigarettes if the relevant manufacturer has not provided the required certification or if the tax stamp agent has been notified by the Commissioner of Public Health that such manufacturer is in violation of the Escrow Statute. Section 1846 provides for seizure and forfeiture of any cigarettes that are unstamped or have been stamped in violation of Section 480-b. Section 481, subdiv. 1(c) authorizes imposition of civil penalties upon any manufacturer or agent violating Section 480-b.

References
The contents of this article have been adapted from a public domain document, Freedom Holdings Inc. v. Spitzer, 357 F.3d 205 (2nd Cir. 2004).

Tobacco control
New York (state) law
Smoking in the United States
Health in New York (state)